George William Cappleman (born March 12, 1947) is a former American football quarterback in the National Football League. He was drafted by the Minnesota Vikings in the second round of the 1970 NFL Draft and also played for the Detroit Lions. He played college football at Florida State.

References

External links
Florida State Seminoles bio

1947 births
Living people
People from Brooksville, Florida
Players of American football from Florida
American football quarterbacks
Florida State Seminoles football players
Minnesota Vikings players
Detroit Lions players